Phan Duy Lam (born 26 November 1988) is a Vietnamese footballer who plays as a defender for V.League 2 club Khánh Hòa.

References 

1988 births
Living people
Vietnamese footballers
People from Da Nang
Association football defenders
V.League 1 players
SHB Da Nang FC players